Statistics of the Scottish Football League in season 1981–82.

Scottish Premier Division

Scottish First Division

Scottish Second Division

See also
1981–82 in Scottish football

References

 
Scottish Football League seasons